Newell Lusk (15 January 1875 – 23 July 1956) was a New Zealand cricketer. He played eight first-class matches for Auckland between 1899 and 1904.

See also
 List of Auckland representative cricketers

References

External links
 

1875 births
1956 deaths
New Zealand cricketers
Auckland cricketers
Cricketers from Auckland